Hesketh Park may refer to:

Hesketh Park, Southport, a public park in Southport, Merseyside, also used locally to describe the residential area near the park
Hesketh Park railway station, a former railway station in Southport, Merseyside
Hesketh Park (cricket ground), in Dartford, Kent